is a train station located in Asakura, Fukuoka.

Lines
Nishi-Nippon Railroad
Amagi Line

Platforms

Adjacent stations

Surrounding area 
 Ōita Expressway
 Japan National Route 322
 Amagi Futaba Kindergarten
 Katsuki Hospital

Railway stations in Fukuoka Prefecture
Railway stations in Japan opened in 1921